This Is Ty Herndon: Greatest Hits is the first compilation album by American country music artist Ty Herndon, released in March 26, 2002. Its only single was the previously unreleased "A Few Short Years". Shortly before this album's release, Herndon charted at #37 on the Hot Country Songs charts with "Heather's Wall", a track for an unreleased album for Epic. This Is Ty Herndon served as Herndon's last album for Epic Records.

Track listing

APreviously unreleased.

Personnel on tracks on 11-13
Matt Chamberlain - drums
J.T. Corenflos - electric guitar
Melodie Crittenden - background vocals
Larry Franklin - fiddle
Paul Franklin - steel guitar
Ty Herndon - lead vocals
Wes Hightower - background vocals
David Huff - drum programming, percussion
Sonya Isaacs - background vocals
Troy Johnson - background vocals
Paul Leim - drums
Jerry McPherson - electric guitar
Steve Nathan - Hammond organ, piano, synthesizer
Alison Prestwood - bass guitar
Darrell Scott - acoustic guitar, mandolin
Biff Watson - acoustic guitar, electric guitar
Jonathan Yudkin - celtic harp, fiddle

Chart performance

References

2002 greatest hits albums
Ty Herndon albums
Epic Records compilation albums